The Ōrewa River is a river of the Auckland Region of New Zealand's North Island. It flows east to reach Whangaparāoa Bay just to the north of Whangaparaoa Peninsula. The town of Orewa is near the river's mouth.

See also
List of rivers of New Zealand

External links
 New Zealand Gazetteer: Ōrewa River

Rivers of the Auckland Region
Rivers of New Zealand
Hauraki Gulf catchment